The Porsche Supercup (officially known as Porsche Mobil 1 Supercup, known as Porsche Michelin Supercup prior to 2007) is an international one-make sports car racing series supporting the FIA Formula One World Championship organized by Porsche Motorsport GmbH.

Porsche Supercup drivers compete in identical Porsche 911 GT3 Cup cars. On average, 24 race cars take part in each race. Most circuits visited by the series are European, although circuits in Bahrain, United Arab Emirates, the United States and Mexico have been included in the calendar as well.

History
Since 1993 the Porsche Michelin Supercup has run as support to the FIA Formula One World Championship. The number of races has grown from the original nine to total 13 in 2006, although decreasing to 11 in 2017 and eight in 2020.

Regulations
Two sets of slick tyres may be used per car each weekend. The number of wet tyres is unlimited. The tyres are identical for all competitors and are not permitted to be pre-warmed or chemically treated.

The in-race pit stop is also allowed if in case of force majeure like tyre puncture, body damage, weather conditions changing and others but in-race pit stop is not mandatory due to shorter race duration and also refuelling is not permitted during race only.

Racing flags
These are the racing flags that usually used in every Porsche Mobil 1 Supercup race weekends:

Racing cars

Chassis
Porsche Supercup cars adhere to a rear-engined rear-wheel-drive design. A roll cage serves as a carbon-fibre space frame chassis and is covered by a multiple-gauge sheet metal body. They have a closed cockpit, fenders, a rear wing, and an aerodynamic splitter. Each team may purchase cars and engines from other teams.

The car has a front MacPherson strut suspension, and a rear Multi-link suspension. Brake discs must be made of steel and may not exceed  diameter. The only aerodynamic components on the vehicles are the front splitter, rear wing, solid polycarbonate glass window in the windows only, and side skirts. The use of rear diffusers, vortex generators, canards, wheel well vents, hood vents, and undertrays are prohibited.

Porsche Supercup cars are required to have at least 1 working windshield wiper installed on the car for all tracks as a part of the road racing rules package.

Evolution of Porsche Supercup cars

911 Cup (Type 964)

For the inaugural 1993 Porsche Supercup season the 964 Cup (used in Carrera Cup from 1992) based on the 964 Carrera RS (itself based on the earlier 1990 964 Carrera Cup) was the vehicle of choice. Compared to the road car the Cup race car features a similarly stripped-out interior and retains the catalytic converter, 18 inch magnesium wheels and ABS but was lowered by 20mm, featured a full roll cage and no passenger seat.

911 Cup 3.8 (Type 993)

Based on the 993 Carrera 2 and used in the Porsche Supercup for seasons 1994–1997.

911 GT3 Cup (Type 996)

Raced in the Porsche Supercup seasons 1998–2001. Basis for the upcoming 996 GT3 road car, featuring a 3.6 litre boxer engine on basis of the GT1 block. For the 2001 season the GT3 Cup received modified aerodynamics including an enlarged rear wing and improved cooling.

911 GT3 Cup (Type 996 II)

Raced in the Porsche Supercup seasons 2002–2004. For 2002 the GT3 Cup received several changes based on the 996.2 Carrera and Turbo models, including Turbo-style headlights. The new body significantly improves aerodynamics and cooling. For the 2004 season the car received further upgrades. Gear ratios of fourth, fifth and sixth gears have been shortened. An 89-litre fuel tank improves endurance racing capabilities. In the interior changes are made to enable the use of the HANS device.

911 GT3 Cup (Type 997)

Raced in the Porsche Supercup seasons 2005–2009. The 997-based Cup car features significantly improved aerodynamics and lightweight CFRP parts, including doors, rear body panels, engine deck lid and rear wing. Parts of the suspension are adopted from the GT3 RSR.

911 GT3 Cup 3.8 (Type 997 II)

Raced in the Porsche Supercup seasons 2010–2012. The vehicle was unveiled at the 2009 Frankfurt Motor Show and deliveries began in the same year. The base MSRP of the European model was €149,850 (before tax).

911 GT3 Cup (Type 991)

Based on the Porsche 911 GT3 type 991, this 911 GT3 Cup was used in the Porsche Supercup for the seasons 2013–2016. The Porsche 911 GT3 Cup Type 991 features the new gearbox paddle-shifters for the first time.

911 GT3 Cup (Type 991 II)

Raced in the Porsche Supercup from the 2017 season until the end of the 2020 season. Based on the latest 911 GT3 road car it features a larger 4.0-litre flat-six boxer engine, improved aerodynamics and an enlarged escape-hatch in the roof and is priced at €189,900 excluding taxes.

911 GT3 Cup (Type 992)

The standard Porsche 911 GT3 Cup (Type 992) raced in the Porsche Supercup starting for the first time in the 2021 season and is expected to race for the next few seasons.

Transmission, gearbox and clutches
For the transmission gearboxes, all Porsche Mobil 1 Supercup cars currently utilize a semi-automatic transmission with a 6-speed gearbox (including reverse gear) operated by paddle shifters and supplied by in-house Porsche since the 2013 season. From 1993 to 2012, all Porsche Mobil 1 Supercup cars used sequential manual transmission with a 6-speed gearbox operated by a conventional sequential shifter. The clutch of all Porsche Mobil 1 Supercup cars is a sintered metal-plate clutch operated by foot-pedal and provided by ZF Sachs. The mechanical limited-slip differential is also allowed and constant velocity joint tripod driveshafts are also used. All Porsche Mobil 1 Supercup cars drivetrain is currently rear-engine with rear-wheel-drive layout.

Cockpit and safety components

For the safety equipment, all Porsche Mobil 1 Supercup cars seating utilizes racing bucket driver's seat with 6-point seat belts. The steering wheel of all Porsche Mobil 1 Supercup cars are made exclusively in-house by Porsche Motorsport GmbH. All Porsche Mobil 1 Supercup cars are also equipped with Cosworth Omega Intelligent Colour Display units since 2013 until 2020 season until it was replaced by all-new larger in-house Porsche Motorsport display units from 2021 season onwards. The fire extinguisher of all Porsche Mobil 1 Supercup cars are included in the bottom right-hand side underneath. The interior rear-view mirror is still currently used since 1993 until present.

The cockpit of all Porsche Mobil 1 Supercup cars are fully protected by doors, windshields and roofs (shielded by polycarbonate glass for windscreen, side windows and rear windows including also windshield wipers for rain weather only in the windscreen) because of current coupé-type car.

Championships

Driver championship
Points are assigned to the first 15 finishers of each race and all races count towards the championship. To receive points, a driver must compete in multiple races per season. Since 2008, there have been two bonus points awarded for the driver who secures pole position in qualifying.

In the case of a tie, Porsche Supercup will determine the champion based on the most first-place finishes. If there is still a tie, Porsche Supercup will determine the champion by the most second-place finishes, then the most third-place finishes, etc., until a champion is determined. Porsche Supercup will apply the same system to other ties in the rankings at the close of the season and at any other time during the season.

Team championship
The points of the two best drivers of each team are added up. At the end of the season Porsche rewards the three best placed teams with prize money.

Prize money
In 2006 and 2007, Porsche AG pays around 820,000 euros to drivers and teams. Per race the winner receives 9,000 euros, the runner-up 7,500 euros and the third placed driver 6,500 euros. For a 15th place 1,400 euros are paid. Additionally, the 2006 or 2007 champion receives a Porsche road car. The driver with the fastest laps will be given a premium watch from Porsche Design.

In 2015, Porsche says it pays "more than 730,000 Euros in prize money to drivers and teams. In addition, the overall winner receives a special prize. The winner of the rookie classification receives an additional prize of 30,000 Euros providing he/she reregisters for the following year’s Porsche Mobil 1 Supercup."

Champions
Dutch driver Patrick Huisman is the most successful driver in the championship, having won four straight titles between 1997 and 2000. Huisman's record is followed by René Rast and Michael Ammermüller with three titles and Jeroen Bleekemolen, Richard Westbrook, and Larry ten Voorde with two titles each. The reigning champion is the Luxembourgish driver Dylan Pereira.

Popularity
At the Grand Prix circuits during 2006 an average of 125,000 spectators witnessed the action from the grandstands at each round. According to Porsche AG races attracted 22 million TV viewers worldwide, most of them in Europe where Eurosport provides regular coverage.

Porsche Carrera Cup

Porsche also runs many regional and national one-make production racing series around the globe.

See also
Audi R8 LMS Cup
Ferrari Challenge
Lamborghini Super Trofeo
Audi Sport TT Cup

References

External links

 
Porsche Mobil 1 Supercup Online Magazine
Carrera Cup
The Porsche Carrera Cup Great Britain
997 Cup
The Porsche Carrera Cup Asia
The Porsche Carrera Cup Asia Season
The Porsche Carrera Cup Scandinavia (in swedish)

 
Stock car racing
Recurring sporting events established in 1993